ASM-One is an integrated macro assembler for the Amiga computer and Motorola 680x0 processor. ASM-One was developed by Rune Gram-Madsen in 1990 and released through the German publisher DMV-Verlag in 1991. It was distributed with either an English or German manual. The price of the assembler was 139 DM (71 €). The last copies were sold in 1992. It received great reviews at the time.

Features 

Fully integrated development package with fullscreen-editor, assembler, monitor, debugger and manual
Written entirely in assembly language; very light (about 90 kbytes) and fast
Operation via keyboard or mouse 
Can create standard object modules to be linked with Blink
Assembler provides macro capabilities, include-files and peephole-optimizer
Crash-recovery via level-7-interrupt
Includes Amiga System include files and offset tables

Development 
Before the source code was made public a group called TFA from the Amiga Scene took over working on the assembler without commercial intent.

The original (commercial) releases were 1.0, 1.01 and 1.02.

After the publisher stopped distribution, the assembler was disassembled and extensions where added by TFA, released without changing the name.

Other spin-offs (Trash'm One, AsmPro being the two most known) started to appear as well, which were all based on either the original V1.02 or a disassembled version of AsmOne with TFA's extensions.

TFA added compilation, debugging and runtime support for MC68010, MC68020, MC68030, MC68040, MC68881, MC68882.

In 1995 TFA members introduced ReTargetable Graphics support and PowerPC (PPC)

Development continues as a hobby project by TFA. The program is currently at V1.48. (Beta version is 1.49.)

See also 

Comparison of assemblers

References 

1991 software
Assemblers
Amiga development software
Assembly language software